Notts County Women F.C. founded in May 2018, is a women's football club based in Nottingham, England. They are currently playing in the East Midlands Regional Women's Football League Premier Division for the 2022/23 season. The club is an affiliate of the male football club Notts County F.C., they play their home games at Greenwich Avenue, Basford, which is the home of Basford United F.C. Notts County Women FC, under the management of Adam Dunleavy and Adam Woolley have won promotion into the East Midlands Regional Women's Football League with an unbeaten league run stretching back to November 2018.

See also
 List of women's association football clubs in England and Wales
 Women's football in England
 List of women's association football clubs

References

External links
 Notts County Women at Notts County F.C.
 Fixtures 2021/22

Women's football clubs in England
Notts County F.C.
Association football clubs established in 2018
2018 establishments in England